Pogar Bangil Stadium or R. Soedarsono Stadium is a multi-use stadium in Bangil, Pasuruan Regency, East Java, Indonesia.  

It is currently used mostly for football matches and is used as the home stadium for Persekabpas Pasuruan.  The stadium has a capacity of 10,000 people.

References

Pasuruan Regency
Sports venues in Indonesia
Football venues in Indonesia
Buildings and structures in East Java